Un mundo maravilloso ("A Wonderful World") is a 2006 Mexican comedy film produced by Bandidos Films, directed by Luis Estrada and considered a "spiritual sequel" to La ley de Herodes; it's a political satire about Vicente Fox Quesada's government and its neo-liberal doctrine.

Contrary to La ley de Herodes, this film was released without interference from Fox's government, even was partly sponsored by Imcine.

External links

 DVD review.

2006 films
2000s fantasy comedy films
Films directed by Luis Estrada
2000s Spanish-language films
Mexican satirical films
Mexican political satire films
2006 comedy films
2000s Mexican films